The 1942 Cork Senior Hurling Championship was the 54th staging of the Cork Senior Hurling Championship since its establishment by the Cork County Board in 1887. The draw for the opening round fixtures took place at the Cork Convention on 25 January 1942. The championship began on 19 April 1942 and ended on 4 October 1942.

Glen Rovers entered the championship as the defending champions and were in search of a ninth successive title, however, they were beaten by Ballincollig in the semi-final.

The final was played on 4 October 1942 at the Athletic Grounds in Cork, between St. Finbarr's and Ballincollig, in what was their first ever meeting in the final. St. Finbarr's won the match by 5-07 to 2-02 to claim their 11th championship title overall and a first title in nine years.

Team changes

To Championship

Promoted from the Cork Intermediate Hurling Championship
 Cloughduv

From Championship

Regraded to the Cork Intermediate Hurling Championship
 Mallow

Declined to field a team
 Carbery

Results

First round

Blackrock received a bye in this round.

Second round

Ballincollig and Glen Rovers received byes in this round.

Semi-finals

Final

Championship statistics

Miscellaneous

On 20 September 1942, Glen Rovers suffered their first championship defeat since 21 May 1933.
 St Finbarr's win their first title since 1933.

References

Cork Senior Hurling Championship
Cork Senior Hurling Championship